Ratnayake Mudiyanselage Chandrasiri Bandara Ratnayake (known as C. B. Ratnayake) is a Sri Lankan politician, a member of the Parliament of Sri Lanka and a government minister.

References
 

Living people
Members of the 10th Parliament of Sri Lanka
Members of the 12th Parliament of Sri Lanka
Members of the 13th Parliament of Sri Lanka
Members of the 14th Parliament of Sri Lanka
Members of the 15th Parliament of Sri Lanka
Members of the 16th Parliament of Sri Lanka
Sri Lanka Podujana Peramuna politicians
Sports ministers of Sri Lanka
Sri Lanka Freedom Party politicians
United People's Freedom Alliance politicians
1958 births